Enni Rekola (1909–1982) was a Finnish stage and film actress.

Selected filmography
 Soot and Gold (1945)
 Golden Light (1946)
 Tree Without Fruit (1947)

References

Bibliography 
 Marjatta Ecaré & Irmeli Paavola. Tampereen Työväen Teatteri. Tampereen Työväen Teatteri, 1976.

External links 
 

1909 births
1982 deaths
Actors from Vyborg
People from Viipuri Province (Grand Duchy of Finland)
Finnish stage actresses
Finnish film actresses